HMS Osiris (S13) was an  that served in the Royal Navy.

Design and construction

The Oberon class was a direct follow on of the Porpoise class, with the same dimensions and external design, but updates to equipment and internal fittings, and a higher grade of steel used for fabrication of the pressure hull.

Displacement was 1,610 tons standard, 2,030 tons full load when surfaced, and 2,410 tons full load when submerged. Propulsion machinery consisted of 2 Admiralty Standard Range 16 VMS diesel generators, and two  electric motors, each driving a  3-bladed propeller at up to 400 rpm. Eight  diameter torpedo tubes were fitted (six facing forward, two aft), with a total payload of 24 torpedoes. The boats were fitted with Type 186 and Type 187 sonars, and an I-band surface search radar. The standard complement was 68: 6 officers, 62 sailors.

Osiris was laid down by Vickers-Armstrongs on 26 January 1962, and launched on 29 November 1962. The boat was commissioned into the Royal Navy on 11 January 1964.

Operational history

Osiris attended the 1977 Silver Jubilee Fleet Review off Spithead when she was part of the Submarine Flotilla.

Decommissioning and fate
She was decommissioned and sold to the Canadian Forces in 1989 for spare parts, towed to Birkenhead on the River Mersey where Cammell Laird shipyard completed the stripping out. In August 1991, the remains were moved to Garston for final demolition and scrapped in 1992.

References

Publications
 

 

Oberon-class submarines of the Royal Navy
Ships built in Barrow-in-Furness
1964 ships
Cold War submarines of the United Kingdom
Oberon-class submarines of Canada
Auxiliary ships of the Royal Canadian Navy